Sir Robert de Quincy ( 1140 – c. 1197), Justiciar of Lothian, was a 12th-century English and Scottish noble.

Life
Quincy was a son of Saer de Quincy and Matilda de Senlis. Robert was granted the castle of Forfar and a toft in Haddington by King William of Scotland, his cousin. He served as joint Justiciar of Lothian serving from 1171 to 1178.

Robert accompanied King Richard I of England on the Third Crusade in 1190. He led a force to take aid to Antioch in 1191 and also collected prisoners from Tyre. Returning from the crusade, Robert took part in Richard I's campaigns in Normandy in 1194 and 1196. He succeeded to the English estates of his nephew Saer in 1192.

Marriage and issue
Robert married firstly Orabilis, daughter of Nes fitz William, Lord of Leuchars. They had:
Saher de Quincy (died 1219), married Margaret de Beaumont, had issue.

References

Sources
Fleming, Alexander & Mason, Roger. Scotland and the Flemish People. Birlinn Ltd, 2019.

External links
People of Medieval Scotland 1093-1371 - Robert de Quincy (d.1200x01)
Geni.com Sir Robert de Quincy, Lord of Long Buckby

12th-century Scottish people
12th-century English people
Medieval Scottish knights
Medieval English knights
Scoto-Normans
Christians of the Third Crusade
Year of birth uncertain